Mark Maurice Salmon (born 31 October 1988) is an Irish former professional footballer who played as a midfielder. He previously played for Wolverhampton Wanderers, Port Vale, Drogheda United, Athlone Town, Longford Town and Bray Wanderers. He helped Longford Town to finish as champions of the League of Ireland First Division in 2014.

Career
Salmon is a product of the Wolverhampton Wanderers academy, but after signing his first professional contract in February 2007, failed to make a first team appearance for the club. He joined League One Port Vale on loan in November 2007, and made his debut on 24 November as a substitute, replacing Marc Laird 87 minutes into a 3–1 defeat by Doncaster Rovers at Vale Park. His first senior start came ten days later at Elland Road, as Leeds United played out a comfortable 3–0 win. He played in Vale's infamous 1–0 defeat FA Cup to Chasetown, though remained in the first eleven until returning to Molineux in January.

He was released by Wolves in early 2009 and soon returned to his native Ireland to join League of Ireland side, Drogheda United. In the summer of 2009, he switched to Athlone Town of the First Division. He joined Longford Town in February 2010, and scored two goals in 32 league games in 2010. He scored eight goals in 28 appearances for the club in 2011. He scored three goals in 38 appearances in 2012, as Tony Cousins's Longford reached the play-off semi-finals following a third-place finish in the league. He scored two goals in 14 appearances in 2013, as Longford finished second and reached the play-off finals, where they were beaten by Bray Wanderers.

In his fifth year at the club, he finally got to enjoy success with "De Town" at the end of the 2014 season as the club won promotion as champions of the First Division. Salmon lifted the cup as club captain following the title being secured. Longford also reached the final of the Leinster Senior Cup, losing 2–1 to St Patrick's Athletic at Strokestown Road.

Salmon signed for Bray Wanderers on a two-year contract in November 2015 after being released by Longford. Harry Kenny's "Seagulls" finished sixth in 2016, with Salmon making 28 appearances and scoring four goals. Bray again finished sixth in the 2017 season, with Salmon scoring one goal from 29 matches.

Career statistics

Honours
Longford Town
League of Ireland First Division: 2014
Leinster Senior Cup runner-up: 2014

References

1988 births
Living people
Association footballers from Dublin (city)
Republic of Ireland association footballers
Association football midfielders
Wolverhampton Wanderers F.C. players
Port Vale F.C. players
Drogheda United F.C. players
Athlone Town A.F.C. players
Longford Town F.C. players
Bray Wanderers F.C. players
English Football League players
League of Ireland players